Rye Town Park-Bathing Complex and Oakland Beach is a historic park and public beach located on Long Island Sound at Rye, Westchester County, New York. It is located next to the separately listed Playland Amusement Park.  It was designed in 1909 by architects Upjohn & Conable (Hobart Upjohn and George W. Conable) and landscape architects Brinley & Holbrook.  There are six historically significant buildings and structures; they are the Mission Revival style Bathing Complex. This includes the Bathing Pavilion and two shelters, a restaurant (1910), the Spring House, and the Women's Bath House (1925).

It was added to the National Register of Historic Places in 2003.

See also
National Register of Historic Places listings in southern Westchester County, New York

References

External links

Parks on the National Register of Historic Places in New York (state)
Mission Revival architecture in New York (state)
Buildings and structures completed in 1925
Buildings and structures in Westchester County, New York
National Register of Historic Places in Westchester County, New York